Hollingbery is a surname. Notable people with the surname include:

Babe Hollingbery (1893–1974), American football coach
George Hollingbery (born 1963), British politician
Thomas Hollingbery, 18th-century English Anglican priest
Vilma Hollingbery (born 1932), British actress

There is a town on the south of England near Brighton by the name of Hollingbury which may be the source of Hollingbery surname.